Jørn Valdemar Hansen (born 19 May 1946) is a Danish former footballer who played as a goalkeeper. He made one appearance for the Denmark national team in 1973 and competed in the men's tournament at the 1972 Summer Olympics.

References

External links
 

1946 births
Living people
People from Lolland
Danish men's footballers
Association football goalkeepers
Denmark international footballers
Olympic footballers of Denmark
Footballers at the 1972 Summer Olympics
Nykøbing FC players
Boldklubben Frem players
FC Vestsjælland players